Jackson Kirkconnell (born 30 August 2003) is a Caymanian footballer.

Career statistics

International

References

2003 births
Living people
Association football midfielders
Caymanian footballers
Cayman Islands youth international footballers
Cayman Islands international footballers
Caymanian expatriate footballers
Caymanian expatriate sportspeople in England
Expatriate footballers in England